The Beach of Durrës is the biggest and most visited beach in Albania. A number of notable Hotels overlook the beach such as the Adriatik Hotel.

This destination is popular with people from Albania (mainly from Middle and North Albania), Kosovo and North Macedonia. It is also a popular summer and weekend destination for the people of Tirana and Durrës. The estimated number of tourists, most of whom frequent the beach during the summer period, is about 600,000 a year.

See also 
 Durrës
 List of beaches in Albania

References

Durrës
Beaches of Albania
Tourist attractions in Durrës County
Geography of Durrës County